Leonel Alberto Alves (born 5 April 1957 in Macau) is a member and a former First Secretary of the Legislative Assembly of Macau (1996-2009). In 2005, Alves became a member of the Executive Council of Macau and in 2008, he became a local member of the National Committee of the Chinese People's Political Consultative Conference.

Born to a Portuguese father and a Chinese mother, Alves became a Chinese citizen in 2004, thereby renouncing his Portuguese nationality.

Election results

See also
 List of members of the Legislative Assembly of Macau

References

1954 births
Living people
Cantonese people
Members of the Legislative Assembly of Macau
Macanese people